The Bishop of Speyer is the Ordinary of the Roman Catholic Diocese of Speyer, which is a suffragan see of the Archdiocese of Bamberg. The diocese covers an area of 5,893 km². The current bishop is Karl-Heinz Wiesemann.

Listed here are the bishops of the diocese and auxiliary bishops.

Bishops to 1802
At some point the bishops of Speyer acquired imperial fiefs.

Bishops after 1818

Auxiliary bishops
Pierre Spitznagel, O. Carm. (1444–1465)
Johann Isenberg, O.F.M. (1466–1484)
Stephan Karrer, O.P. (1484–1486)
Heinrich Schertlin (1486–1511)
Lukas Schleppel (1512–1520)
Anton Engelbrecht (1520–1525)
Nikolaus Schigmers, O.S.A. (1529–1541)
Georg Schweicker (1544–1563)
Matthais Ob (1566–1572)
Heinrich Fabricius (1575–1595)
Dionys Burckard (1596–1605)
Theobald Manshalter (1606–1610)
Johannes Streck (1611–)
Wolfgang Ralinger (1623–1663)
Johann Brassert (1673–1684)
Johann Philipp Burkhard (1685–1698)
Peter Cornelius Beyweg (1701–1744)
Johann Adam Buckel (1745–1771)
Johann Andreas Seelmann (1772–1789)
Valentin Philipp Anton Schmidt (1790–1805)
Ernst Gutting (1971–1994)
Otto Georgens (1995–)

See also 
Lists of office-holders
Speyer Cathedral

References